The Bavarian Forest Museum Village is an open air museum near Tittling on the southwestern shore of the Dreiburgensee lake in the Bavarian Forest. It covers about 25 hectares and has over 150 buildings from the period from 1580 to 1850 and a local history collection with 60,000 items. It is thus one of the largest open air museums in Europe.

The museum was founded in 1974 by Georg Höltl with the restoration of the 500-year-old Rothau Mill (Rothaumühle). This building which, following the collapse of its roof timbers in 1972, had been sold by Georg and Centa Höltl, still stands on its original site below the Dreiburgensee. Since then, numerous buildings from across the Bavarian Forest have been transported to the museum. Among the types of building on show are farmhouses, day labourers' houses, chapels, the oldest village school in Germany, workshops and mills. The comprehensive local history collection includes holy articles, farm furniture and household effects, clothing, agricultural tools, jewellery, glass products and carts. Several times a year, a large farmer's market takes place in the museum village, where there are many stalls and demonstrations of old customs and handicrafts.

Literature 
 
 
 
Hartl, Hans; / Merz, Heinrich: Die älteste Volksschule Deutschlands. Tittling, 1981, 171 pp.

See also 
 List of open-air and living museums

Weblinks 

  

Open-air museums in Germany
Folk museums in Germany
Bavarian Forest
Farm museums in Germany
Passau (district)